The following is a list of the 32 episodes of the ITV crime drama series DCI Banks, starring Stephen Tompkinson (series 1-5), Andrea Lowe (series 1-5) and Caroline Catz (series 2-5). Five series plus a pilot episode of the series have been broadcast between 27 September 2010 and 5 October 2016. From June 2014, the first series was repeated on ITV Encore.

Series overview

Episodes

Series 1 (2010–11)
In January 2010, author Peter Robinson announced that he had signed a joint deal with Left Bank Pictures and ITV to adapt novels from the Detective Chief Inspector Alan Banks series for television. Filming of a two-part serial based on the novel Aftermath was completed in July 2010, with scenes filmed on location in Leeds. Aftermath aired on ITV on 27 September – 4 October 2010. The two episodes drew a strong average of 6.55 million viewers, twice becoming the fifth most-watched programme on the ITV network that week. Viewer ratings for the pilot were strong enough to persuade ITV to commission a further six episodes. These consisted of three two-part episodes based on the novels Playing with Fire, Friend of the Devil and Cold is the Grave. Filming began in February 2011, and filming locations included the town of Otley, in which the majority of the episode Friend of the Devil was filmed. This was identifiable by the fact that some shop names in the town were left unchanged during filming. The first episode, Playing with Fire, aired 16 September 2011, and drew an average of 4.5 million viewers. Subsequent episodes achieved similar ratings.

Series 2 (2012)
Filming on Series 2 began in March 2012, and episodes began broadcasting from 10 October. Accompanying novels, with cover photos of Stephen Tompkinson, were released for sale on 25 October. Several new characters were introduced in Series 2, including Alan Banks' parents, Arthur (Keith Barron) and Ida Banks (Polly Hemmingway); DI Helen Morton (Caroline Catz), who fills in for DS Annie Cabbot while she is on maternity leave; and Chief Superintendent (CS) Ron McLaughlin (Nick Sidi), replacement for CS Gerry Rydell, who left when exposed as being corrupt at the end of the first series. Actress Andrea Lowe actually took maternity leave during filming of most of Series 2, and only appeared in a very brief role.

Series 3 (2014)
In December 2012, Peter Robinson announced on his website that the series had been re-commissioned for a third series of three two-part episodes, and in June 2013 confirmed the titles of the episodes to be filmed. The series began filming in August 2013, and began airing from February 2014. Lowe reprises her role as DS Cabbot after being absent from the majority of Series 2 due to maternity leave; Catz also reprises her role as DI Morton. Series 3 sees the departure of DS Jackman (Lorraine Burroughs); however Jack Deam returns to the series as DS Blackstone, Nick Sidi reprises his role as CS McLaughlin, and Danny Rahim joins the cast as DC Lang.

Series 4 (2015)
Filming on the fourth series began in August 2014. For the first time since the series' debut, the fourth series did not feature any changes to the cast. It was also notable for being the first series which consists of entirely unique stories for television, choosing not to adapt any further novels by Robinson. Likewise, it also meant that an entirely new writing team were brought in to script the series, with newcomer Nicholas Hicks-Beach, who first penned scripts for fellow ITV stablemate, Law & Order: UK, being introduced as head writer. Some viewers suggested that it brought a "grittier" feel to the show. Noel Farragher was originally confirmed as the writer for the second story, but was replaced by Nicholas Hicks-Beach for reasons unknown.

Series 5 (2016)
Filming on the fifth and final series began in February 2016. Samuel Anderson and Shaun Dingwall were announced as newcomers to the cast on 23 February, playing the roles of DC Vince Grady and Chief Superintendent Colin Anderson respectively. For the first time, as well as focusing on three separate cases, the series featured an ongoing story arc across all six episodes, focusing on the ongoing investigation into career criminal Steve Richards (Shaun Dooley) and his wife Tamsin (Maimie McCoy). Chris Murray was originally confirmed as the writer for the first story, but was replaced by Nicholas Hicks-Beach for reasons unknown.

Overseas
DCI Banks has been shown in many markets around the world.

It was broadcast in Saudi Arabia by OSN (Orbit Showtime Network) which had forged an exclusive deal with BBC First HD that would carry the broadcast to the Middle East and North Africa with programming screening 48 hours after their UK premiere.

In Denmark, all series aired on DR1 and as one single "full-length" story. In Sweden, SVT 1 aired the pilot and first four series. In France and Germany, Arte aired the pilot and first two series.

In the United States (and Canada through cable feeds), the series was made available on many PBS stations, delayed a few weeks after UK broadcast.

In Portugal, the Fox Crime cable channel started to air the pilot and first series on 4 September 2014, which were re-aired in July 2014, together with the second series. As is normal in Portugal the transmission was in the original English version with Portuguese subtitles.

In Finland, Yle showed the pilot and Series 1 in August 2012, Series 2 in August 2013, Series 3 in January–February 2016, Series 4 in February 2016, and Series 5 in January 2017. All episodes were aired as one single "full-length" story and with Finnish subtitles. The episodes were made available for viewing from Finland at the Yle website for 14 days following the initial broadcast.

In Australia, the series was shown on the national broadcaster, the ABC, on Saturday nights.

In the Netherlands, the pilot and series 1 to 5 were aired as one episode by the national broadcaster NPO.

Notes

References

External links

DCI Banks at Left Bank Pictures

Lists of British crime television series episodes
Lists of British drama television series episodes
Peter Robinson (novelist)